Palmer College Rugby Football Club is an American rugby union team based in Davenport, Iowa. The team plays in the Midwest Rugby Premiership and is the official rugby team of the Palmer College of Chiropractic, founded in 1897 by D.D. Palmer.

History
The rugby program was started by David Palmer (grandson of the college's founder) in 1960. The men's team won multiple collegiate championships in the 1960s and 1970s. In the following decade, the team moved to the senior club division of USA Rugby, advancing to the national championships four times.

Palmer added a women's program in 2004, established by Tracy Francis-Nguyen. The team reached the national playoffs for the first time in 2022.

References

External links
 

American rugby union teams
Rugby clubs established in 1960